Kantana is a Thai production company. Kantana may also refer to:

Kantana language
Kantana Institute, an educational institute in Thailand founded in 2010

See also
Katana (disambiguation)